Alhassan Bashir Fuseini popularly known as Alhaji A.B.A Fuseini (born February 2, 1956) is a journalist and Ghanaian politician and the former deputy Northern Regional Minister of Ghana. He is a member of the Seventh Parliament of the Fourth Republic of Ghana representing the Sagnarigu (Ghana parliament constituency) in the Northern Region on the ticket of the National Democratic Congress.

Personal life 
Fuseini is a Muslim. He is married with four children.

Early life and education 
Fuseini was born on February 2, 1956. He hails from Tamale, a town in the Northern Region of Ghana.
He had his secondary education at the Yendi secondary school and the T.I. Ahmadiyya Senior High School, Kumasi. He had his first degree at the University of Ghana after which he entered the Essex University, UK and obtained a master's degree in Human Rights in 1993. He also holds a Post Graduate Diploma from the International Institute of Journalism, Berlin.

Politics 
Fuseini is a member of the National Democratic Congress (NDC). In 2012, he contested for the  Sagnarigu seat on the ticket of the NDC sixth parliament of the fourth republic and won.

Employment 
 Night Editor at Daily Graphic, Graphic Communications Group of Companies, Accra
 Deputy Regional Minister for Northern Region, 2013–2017
 Member Parliament (January 7, 2013–present; 2nd term)
 Consultant

References

1956 births
Living people
Ghanaian Muslims
National Democratic Congress (Ghana) politicians
Ghanaian MPs 2013–2017
Ghanaian MPs 2021–2025
T.I. Ahmadiyya Senior High School (Kumasi) alumni